Susanna Julie von Bondeli (born 24 December 1731; baptised 1 January 1732, Bern – died 8 August 1778, Neuchâtel), was a famous Swiss salonist and lady of letters. She hosted a salon which became the center of intellectual life in Bern.

Life
The daughter of Friedrich and Julie Bondeli, young Susanna (who later dropped her forename) received an atypically comprehensive education in languages, mathematics and philosophy for a girl given the social mores of the time in which she lived. One of her teachers may have been the radical Samuel Henzi, who was executed in 1749 as principal organizer of a conspiracy to overturn Bern's patrician government.

She never married, but in 1752 began hosting a scientific salon in Bern which would become, a decade later, a centre of the city's cultural life. Luminaries with whom she enjoyed relationships included Johann Georg Zimmermann, Christoph Martin Wieland and Jean-Jacques Rousseau. Bondeli and Christoph Martin Wieland was engaged for a time, but never wed. Bondeli was also a correspondent of Jean-Jacques Rousseau from 1762 forward, as well as with Johann Georg Zimmermann, Sophie von La Roche, and Johann Kaspar Lavater.

References

Sources
 Julie Bondeli, 1732–1778, Briefe. 4 Bände (eds. Angelica Baum, Birgit Christensen), Chronos Verlag, 2012; /
 Eduard Bodemann, Julie Von Bondeli Und Ihr Freundeskreis, Ulan Press, 20 September 2012; ASIN: B009LI2QZO

External links
 Profile, weltwoche.ch; accessed 21 June 2015. 
 Profile, perlentaucher.de; accessed 21 June 2015. 
 Burgerbibliothek Bern: Online Archives Catalogue, katalog.burgerbib.ch; accessed 21 June 2015.

1731 births
1778 deaths
18th-century Swiss people
Swiss salon-holders
People from Bern
Place of birth missing
Place of death missing
18th-century Swiss women